Qalamdan-e Vosta (also Romanized as Qalamdān-e Vosţá; also known as Qalamdān and Qalamdān-e Bālā) is a village in Rostam-e Yek Rural District, in the Central District of Rostam County, Fars Province, Iran. At the 2006 census, its population was 185, in 39 families.

References 

Populated places in Rostam County